Lys or LYS may refer to:

Places
Les Lys, a Premier cru vineyard in Chablis
Lyon–Saint-Exupéry Airport, France (by IATA code)
Lys (department), a département during the First French Empire, now in Belgium
Lys (Dora Baltea), a stream of Aosta Valley in Italy
Lys (river), a river in France and Belgium
Lys, Nièvre, a commune in the Nièvre department in France
Lys, Pyrénées-Atlantiques, a commune in the Pyrénées-Atlantiques department in France
Lys, an old orthography of Liss, Hampshire, England

Science
Lys (or K), an abbreviation for the amino acid lysine
Plural form of the symbol for light-years

People
Eva Lys (born 2002), German tennis player
Francis John Lys (1863–1947), British lecturer and academic administrator
Jan Lys (c. 1590–1629), German painter
Lya Lys (1908–1986), German-born actress
Lys Assia (1924–2018), Swiss singer
Lys Mouithys (born 1985), Congolese football player

Other uses
Battle of the Lys (1918), a battle of World War I in France in the spring of 1918
Fleur-de-lys or Fleur-de-lis, a stylized representation of a lily or iris, used in heraldry
 Lisans Yerleştirme Sınavı (Student Selection and Placement System), a standardized test for admission to higher education in Turkey
LYS (sailing), a sailing handicapping system
Lys, a key town in Arthur C. Clarke's 1956 book The City and the Stars
Lys, a city-state in George R.R. Martin's novels A Song of Ice and Fire

See also
Liss (disambiguation)